Sariwon Youth Stadium(사리원청년경기장) is a multi-purpose stadium in Sariwon, North Korea.  It is currently used mostly for football matches.  The stadium holds 35,000 spectators and opened in 1981.

References

See also 
 List of football stadiums in North Korea

Football venues in North Korea
Sports venues in North Korea
Multi-purpose stadiums in North Korea
Sports venues completed in 1981
Buildings and structures in North Hwanghae Province
Sariwon
1981 establishments in North Korea